Skrzynka  is a village in the administrative district of Gmina Lądek-Zdrój, within Kłodzko County, Lower Silesian Voivodeship, in south-western Poland. Prior to 1945 it was in Germany.

Typical for the region, the German name of the village derives from the name of the Lokator who brought German farmers to the village. 

The village has a population of 382.

References

Villages in Kłodzko County